John Wynn Davidson (1825–1881) was a Union Army brigadier general and brevet major general. General Davidson may also refer to:

Francis Davidson (1892–1973), British Army major general
Garrison H. Davidson (1904–1992), U.S. Army lieutenant general
Henry Brevard Davidson (1831–1899), Confederate States Army brigadier general
John Davidson (British Army officer) (1876–1954), British Army major general
Matthew Wolfe Davidson (fl. 1990s–2020s), U.S. Air Force major general
Phillip Davidson (1915–1996), U.S. Army lieutenant general
William Lee Davidson (1746–1781), North Carolina Militia brigadier general pro tempore in the American Revolutionary War